The Return of Josey Wales is a 1986 American Western film directed by and starring Michael Parks It is a sequel to Clint Eastwood's 1976 film The Outlaw Josey Wales and was adapted from The Vengeance Trail of Josey Wales, the 1976 second novel featuring the Josey Wales character, by Asa Earl Carter. The novel was published under Carter's pen name, Forrest Carter, which he used to present a false persona involving a claim of Cherokee ancestry.

The Eastwood film had been based on the author's 1973 novel The Rebel Outlaw: Josey Wales. 
Eastwood had planned to adapt The Vengeance Trail of Josey Wales himself as a sequel to his original film, but his project was eventually cancelled.

Synopsis
Friends of veteran gunfighter Josey Wales are killed in Mexico by supporters of the executed Mexican Emperor Maximilian. Another friend, Pablo, rides to the ranch where Josey, thought to be dead by the United States government after events in The Outlaw Josey Wales, lives quietly with his wife Laura Lee, their baby son Jamie, her grandmother, and Lone Wolf and his wife and son. After learning of his friends' deaths, Wales travels to Mexico to confront a corrupt lawman and get another friend out of jail.

Cast
 Michael Parks as Josey Wales
 Rafael Campos as Chato
 Everett Sifuentes as Capt. Jesus Escabedo
 Suzie Humphreys as Rose
 John Galt as Kelly
 Charles McCoy as Charlie
 Joe Kurtzo as Nacole
 Paco Vela as Paco
 Bob Magruder as Tenspot
 Benita Faulkner as Enloe

References

External links
  (given a "one-star" rating of 4.2 out of 10 based on 168 user responses as of January 2022)
  (with no recorded ratings as of January 2022)

1986 films
1986 directorial debut films
1986 Western (genre) films
American sequel films
American Western (genre) films
Films based on works by Forrest Carter
Films based on American novels
1980s English-language films
1980s American films